Cyanogen azide, N3CN or CN4, is an azide compound of carbon and nitrogen which is an oily, colourless liquid at room temperature. It is a highly explosive chemical that is soluble in most organic solvents, and normally handled in dilute solution in this form. It was first synthesised by F. D. Marsh at DuPont in the early 1960s. There had been earlier reports of discovering it as a crystalline solid, which were incorrect. 

Cyanogen azide is a primary explosive, although it is far too unstable for practical use as an explosive and is extremely dangerous outside dilute solution. Its use in chemistry has been as a reagent prepared in situ for use in the synthesis of chemicals such as diaminotetrazoles, either in dilute solution or as a gas at reduced pressure. It can be synthesised at below room temperature from the reaction of sodium azide with either cyanogen chloride or cyanogen bromide, dissolved in a solvent such as acetonitrile; this reaction must be done with care due to the production from trace moisture of shock-sensitive byproducts.

References

External links
 NIST

Organoazides
Nitriles
Pseudohalogens